Cachet Hospitality Group (CHG) is a lifestyle branding and management company based in New York.

History 
Cachet Hospitality Group was co-founded by American investor Robert Roche and Alexander Mirza in May 2013. Other founding senior executives of the company included David Laris, Kimy Chen, Yvonne Choi, Martin Key and Aaron Griffiths.

In 2014, Cachet had acquired the rights to the URBN hotel brand from its founders Scott Barrack and Jules Kwan. 

Cachet raised convertible debt capital from former Hilton board member John Notter, DMAC Vice Chairman Farooq Arjomand and Merchants Hospitality in its 3rd and 4th years with properties open and under development in China, Thailand, the U.S. and Mexico.

Cachet negotiated an Asia-Pacific joint venture with Wahlburgers, Cachet, and Cachet investor Farooq Arjomand.

In September 2017, Cachet opened its first hotel in New York City.

References

Hospitality companies of Hong Kong
Hotel chains in China
Hospitality companies of China